Coronel (Crnl.) FAP Francisco Secada Vignetta International Airport  is an airport serving Iquitos, capital of Loreto Region and Peru's fifth largest city. It is also known as Iquitos International Airport, and is one of the main airports in Peru.

It is located 7 km (4 miles) to the southeast of the center of Iquitos. It has a single runway 2,500 m (8,202 ft) in length. It is administered by Aeropuertos del Perú, who were given the concession in 2006; and serves more than 1 million passengers per year, making it the fourth busiest airport in Peru, after those of Lima, Cusco and Arequipa. It is the only airport in Amazonia with the ISO9001 stamp. It is served by airlines such as JetSmartPerú, LATAM Perú, Sky Airline, Star Perú and SAETA, receiving commercial flights daily from Lima, as well as flights to and from Pucallpa and Tarapoto. There are also various connections to smaller towns and communities in the jungle.

The airport plays a particularly important logistical and economic role because the city of Iquitos is only accessible by air or by river. Iquitos and Pucallpa are the main air hubs in the Peruvian Amazon.

History 
In 1973, Iquitos Airport changed its name in commemoration of a pilot of the Peruvian Air Force, Francisco Secada Vignetta, who was born in Iquitos and made his name in the war with Colombia of 1932 - 33.

Airlines and destinations

See also 
Transport in Peru
List of airports in Peru

References

External links 
OurAirports - Iquitos
SkyVector - Iquitos

Airports in Peru
Iquitos
Buildings and structures in Loreto Region